Dudleya virens, the green liveforever or bright green dudleya, is an uncommon species of perennial, succulent plant in the family Crassulaceae, native to several coastal southern California and Baja California locations.

Distribution
The succulent is found growing in the Palos Verdes Hills on the Palos Verdes Peninsula coast in Los Angeles County; on several of the Channel Islands in California; and on Guadalupe Island off the northwestern Baja California Peninsula, Mexico.

Description
Dudleya virens leaves are fleshy and strap-shaped, 8–20 cm long and 1.5–3 cm broad, tapering from the base (or from near middle) and are mostly green. They are arranged in a rosette.

The flowers are white, with five petals 7–10 mm long. They are produced in April, May, and June. Hummingbirds visit the flowers for their nectar.

Subspecies

Cultivation
Dudleya virens is cultivated as an ornamental plant in the specialty native plants and succulents horticulture trade.  It is used in containers, drought tolerant landscapes, and habitat gardens.  It prefers well-draining soil, and grows best in full sun or light shade.

References

External links

Jepson Flora Project: Dudleya virens
USDA Plants Profile: Dudleya virens (Green liveforever)
 Theodore Payne Foundation—California Natives Wiki: Dudleya virens — images.
Dudleya virens — U.C. Photo gallery

virens
Flora of California
Flora of Baja California
Flora of Mexican Pacific Islands
Natural history of the California chaparral and woodlands
Natural history of the Channel Islands of California
Natural history of the Peninsular Ranges
Natural history of Los Angeles County, California
Taxa named by Reid Venable Moran
Garden plants of North America
Drought-tolerant plants
Flora without expected TNC conservation status